Malekabad (also Romanized as Malekābād and Malakābād) is a village in Baqeran Rural District, in the Central District of Birjand County, South Khorasan Province, Iran. At the 2006 census, its population was 98, in 24 families.

References 

Populated places in Birjand County